Jack Waller may refer to:

 Jack Waller (water polo) (born 1989), British water polo player
 Jack Waller (field hockey) (born 1997), English field hockey player